Broderipia cumingii is a species of sea snail, a marine gastropod mollusk in the family Trochidae, the top snails.

Description
The broadly umbilicated shell has an elevated-conical shape. It is cinereus, painted with brown undulating lines. The whorls are ornamented with transverse riblets, the last with 3 median lirae, longitudinally elevated striate. The large umbilicus is encircled by a crenulated cingulus, and within elegantly decussated by radiating and transverse lines. It is distinguished from Broderipia iridescens by its prominent angulated columellar margiu and granulato-corrugose surface.

Distribution
This marine species occurs off the Philippines.

References

External links
 To World Register of Marine Species

cumingii
Gastropods described in 1851